The 1832 United States presidential election in Massachusetts took place between November 2 and December 5, 1832, as part of the 1832 United States presidential election. Voters chose 14 representatives, or electors to the Electoral College, who voted for President and Vice President.

Massachusetts voted for the National Republican candidate, Henry Clay, over the Anti-Masonic Party candidate, William Wirt, and the Democratic Party candidate, Andrew Jackson. Clay won Massachusetts by a wide margin of 25.54%.

Results

See also
 United States presidential elections in Massachusetts

References

Massachusetts
1832
1832 Massachusetts elections